It's Your Fault may refer to:

 It's Your Fault (video), 2013 satirical video 
 It's Your Fault (film), Argentine film